Johan Eliasch (born February 1962) is a Swedish-British businessman, investor, and environmentalist. He was the chief executive of Head, a sporting goods company, from 1995 to 2021, and is now its chairman. In 2006, he co-founded Cool Earth, a charity dedicated to rainforest conservation. Under Prime Minister Gordon Brown, Eliasch served as the Prime Minister's special representative for deforestation and clean energy. Since June 2021, he is the president of the International Ski Federation (FIS).

Early life
Johan Eliasch was born in February 1962, in Djursholm, Sweden. He is the grandson of G. A. Svensson, a leading Swedish industrialist. He graduated in Stockholm with a Master of Science from the Royal Institute of Technology, and a Bachelor of Business Administration from Stockholm University. Eliasch served in a specialist unit at the Life-Guard Dragoons, K1, Stockholm, Sweden (1980-81.)

He was married to Amanda Eliasch, a photographer and filmmaker, from 1988 to 2006; they have two sons.  Their son Charles Eliasch is an opera singer.

Career
Eliasch began his career in turning around companies in 1985, when he joined the London-based private equity firm Tufton Group.  In 1991, he established his own private investment group, Equity Partners.

In 1995, Eliasch took over Head Tyrolia Mares, the sporting goods company now known as Head; he was the Chief Executive Officer of Head from 1995 to 2021.

He is chairman of Equity Partners, and on the board of directors of Aman Resorts and Longleat. He is the chairman of the Saatchi Gallery.

He was a board member of IMG, the British Paralympic Association, Pitch@Palace Global,  advisory board member of the Shimon Peres Peace Centre, World Peace Foundation, the Centre for Social Justice, Societe du Louvre and the British Olympic Association, a member of the Mayor of London’s (Boris Johnson), Jerusalem’s and Rome’s International Business Advisory Councils. He was chairman of Starr Managing Agents, Investcorp Europe and the Aman Resorts Group. He was a director of London Films Productions Limited from August 2016 to January 2017.

The Sunday Times Rich List puts him in number 50 of UK's richest in 2022 with a net worth estimated at £3.6 billion.

Environmental causes
In 2005, Eliasch created the Rainforest Trust and purchased for preservation purposes a  rainforest area in the heart of the Amazon rainforest near the Madeira River. He then reportedly closed down the rainforest logging operations in that area.

In 2006, he co-founded Cool Earth, a charity he co-chairs, which sponsors local NGOs to conserve endangered rainforest and has over 120,000 registered members.

In 2007 he was commissioned by HM Government to undertake an independent review on the role of international finance mechanisms to preserve the global forests in tackling climate change, The Eliasch Review, which was launched in October 2008. The Eliasch Review  has served as a guideline for REDD (Reduced Emissions from Deforestation and Degradation) as part of the international climate change convention.

Eliasch is currently a director of the Foundation for Renewable Energy and Environment, a non-profit, international organisation, and an advisory board member of the All-Party Parliamentary Group for the Polar Regions, Brasilinvest. He is an advisory board member of the Schwarzenegger Climate Initiative and previously served on the International Advisory Board of the Stockholm Resilience Centre.

He chaired the 2021-22 HM Treasury net zero review technology and innovation advisory group, RUSI’s Food, Energy and Water security program, and was a member of the DEFRA Council for Sustainable Business.

Controversy 
In June 2008, the Brazilian and international media reported that the company Gethal, owned by Eliasch, had been issued a fine of R$450 million for alleged illegal deforestation in the Amazon region by IBAMA (Brazilian Institute of Environment and Renewable Natural Resources). The investigation ended in 2013, Eliasch was not fined, and the case was dropped. In a press release note, Gethal stated that “the logging activity of Gethal Amazonas S/A had been out under the Forest Steward Council (FSC) guidelines, a certification that was obtained in 2000. The company was one of the first companies in Brazil to obtain such a certification”.

Political Activity 
Eliasch served in different roles in the Conservative Party between 1999 and 2007: as Deputy Treasurer and Advisor to the Leaders of the Opposition, Shadow Foreign Relations, and European Affairs. He was appointed as special representative of then Labour Party Prime Minister Gordon Brown on deforestation and clean energy. Eliasch was a member of the Austrian president's delegation of State for Trade and Industry (1996-2006). He was chairman of the Young Conservatives Party in Djursholm, Sweden, from 1979–1982.

In 2006, Eliasch co-founded the Global Strategy Forum with Rt Hon Michael Ancram, and became the foundation's first president.

International Ski and Snowboard Federation (FIS) 
In June 2021, Eliasch was elected as president of the International Ski and Snowboard Federation (FIS) at the 52nd International Ski Congress, succeeding Gian-Franco Kasper, who had run the organisation for 23 years. Eliasch stepped down as CEO of Head after his election.

At the 53rd International Ski Congress in May 2022, Eliasch ran unopposed and was re-elected as FIS president through 2026 but some delegates called the elections undemocratic as it was not possible to vote against him; as a result 15 national associations walked out during his election and 40 % of the delegates abstained.

References

External links

Eliasch Review

1962 births
Living people
Swedish billionaires
Swedish businesspeople
Swedish environmentalists
Swedish film producers
International Ski Federation executives